The Sevier County Courthouse in Sevierville, Tennessee is a historic courthouse built in 1895.  It was listed on the National Register of Historic Places in 1971.

It was designed in Beaux Arts style by the McDonald Brothers of Louisville.  It is tall and visible from quite far away.

There is a statue of Dolly Parton designed by sculptor Jim Gray on the grounds of the courthouse.

References

External links

National Register of Historic Places in Sevier County, Tennessee
Romanesque Revival architecture in Tennessee
Beaux-Arts architecture in Tennessee
Government buildings completed in 1895
Courthouses on the National Register of Historic Places in Tennessee
County courthouses in Tennessee